The Saint Petersburg Challenger is a professional tennis tournament played on hard courts. It is currently part of the ATP Challenger Tour. It is held in Saint Petersburg, Russia.

Past finals

Singles

Doubles

References

ATP Challenger Tour
Hard court tennis tournaments
2021 establishments in Russia
St. Petersburg Challenger